Diphyonyx sukacevi, formerly Brachygeophilus sukacevi, is a species of soil centipede in the family Geophilidae found in the most western part of the Caucasus range and the Manych valley north of the Caucasus. It's characterized by its 65–81 leg pairs, 5-7 slender filaments on the mid-part of the labrum, condyles between the anterior trunk sterna, and the lack of a single, isolated pore on each coxo-pleuron.

References 

Geophilomorpha
 Myriapods of Europe
Animals described in 2008